Sketch Engine is a corpus manager and text analysis software developed by Lexical Computing CZ s.r.o. since 2003. Its purpose is to enable people studying language behaviour (lexicographers, researchers in  corpus linguistics, translators or language learners) to search large text collections according to complex and linguistically motivated queries. Sketch Engine gained its name after one of the key features, word sketches: one-page, automatic, corpus-derived summaries of a word's grammatical and collocational behaviour. Currently, it supports and provides corpora in 90+ languages.

History of development 
Sketch Engine is a product of Lexical Computing Limited, a company founded in 2003 by the lexicographer and research scientist Adam Kilgarriff. He started a collaboration with Pavel Rychlý, a computer scientist working at the Natural Language Processing Centre, Masaryk University, and the developer of Manatee and Bonito (two major parts of the software suite), and introduced the concept of word sketches.

Since then, Sketch Engine has been commercial software, however, all the core features of Manatee and Bonito that were developed by 2003 (and extended since then) are freely available under the GPL license within the NoSketch Engine suite.

Features 
A list of tools available in Sketch Engine:
 Word sketches – a one-page automatic derived summary of a word's grammatical and collocational behaviour
 Word sketch difference – compares and contrasts two words by analysing their collocation
 Distributional Thesaurus – automated thesaurus finding words with similar meaning or appearing in the same/similar context
 Concordance search – finds examples of a word form, lemma, phrase, tag or complex structure
 Collocation search – word co-occurrence analysis displaying the most frequent words (to a search word) which can be regarded as collocation candidates
 Word lists – generates frequency lists which can be filtered with complex criteria
 n-grams – generates frequency lists of multi-word expressions
 Terminology / Keyword extraction (both monolingual and bilingual) – automatic extraction key words and multi-word terms from texts (based on frequency count and linguistic criteria)
 Diachronic analysis (Trends) – detecting words which undergo changes in the frequency of use in time (show trending words)
 Corpus building and management – create corpora from the Web or uploaded texts including part-of-speech tagging and lemmatization which can be used as data mining software
 Parallel corpus (bilingual) facilities – looking up translation examples (EUR-Lex corpus, Europarl corpus, OPUS corpus, etc.) or building parallel corpus from own aligned texts
 Text type analysis – statistics of metadata in the corpus

Keywords and terminology extraction 
It is a tool for automatic term extraction for identifying words typical of a particular corpus, document, or text. It supports extracting one-word and multi-word units from monolingual and bilingual texts. The terminology extraction feature provides a list of relevant terms based on comparison with a large corpus of general language. This tool is also a separate service operating as OneClick terms with a dedicated interface.

List of text corpora 
Sketch Engine provides access to more than 700 text corpora. There are monolingual as well as multilingual language corpora of different sizes (from thousand of words up to 60 billions of words) and various sources (web, books, subtitles, legal documents, etc.). The list of corpora includes British National Corpus, Brown Corpus, Cambridge Academic English Corpus and Cambridge Learner Corpus, CHILDES corpora of child language, OpenSubtitles (a set of 60 parallel corpora), 24 multilingual corpora of EUR-Lex documents, TenTen Corpus Family (multi-billion web corpora), trends corpora (monitor corpora with daily updates), etc.

Architecture 

Sketch Engine consists of three main components: an underlying database management system called Manatee, a web interface search front-end called Bonito and a web interface for corpus building and management called Corpus Architect.

Manatee 

Manatee is a database management system specifically devised for effective indexing of large text corpora. It is based on the idea of inverted indexing (keeping an index of all positions of a given word in the text). It has been used to index text corpora comprising tens of billions of words.

Searching corpora indexed by Manatee is performed by formulating queries in the Corpus Query Language (CQL).

Manatee is written in C++ and offers an API for a number of other programming languages including Python, Java, Perl and Ruby. Recently, it was rewritten into Go for faster processing of corpus queries.

Bonito 

Bonito is a web interface for Manatee providing access to corpus search. In the client–server model, Manatee is the server and Bonito plays the client part. It is written in Python.

Corpus Architect 

Corpus Architect is a web interface providing corpus building and management features. It is also written in Python.

Applications 
Sketch Engine has been used by major British or other publishing houses for producing dictionaries such as Macmillan English Dictionary, Dictionnaires Le Robert, Oxford University Press or Shogakukan and four of the UK's five biggest dictionary publishers use Sketch Engine.

See also
 SkELL – a free web service for language learning based on Sketch Engine

References

Related publications

External links

 Sketch Engine website
 List of corpora available in Sketch Engine
 OneClick terms – an online term extractor with term extraction technology from Sketch Engine

Applied linguistics
Computational linguistics
Corpus linguistics
Database management systems
Data mining and machine learning software
Lexicography
Linguistic research
Natural language processing
Text analysis
Text mining